The Ultimate Jerky Boys is a double-disc compilation album by the Jerky Boys. It was released on October 26, 2004.

Track listing

Disc one
 "Sol's Civil War Memorabilia"
 "Sol's Civil War Memorabilia (Part 2)"
 "Piano Tuner"
 "Uncle Freddie"
 "Unemployed Painter"
 "Laser Surgery"
 "Insulator Job"
 "The Gay Model"
 "The Home Wrecker"
 "Egyptian Magician"
 "Sol's Glasses"
 "Bad Tomatoes"
 "Car Salesman"
 "Sushi Chef"
 "Super Across The Way"
 "Auto Mechanic"
 "Dental Malpractice"
 "Starter Motor Repair"
 "Hurt At Work"
 "Hot Rod Mover"
 "Firecracker Mishap"
 "Irate Tile Man"
 "Punitive Damage"
 "Gay Hard Hat"

Disc two
 "Sol's Naked Photo"
 "Ball Game Beating"
 "Pizza Lawyer"
 "Sol's Nude Beach"
 "Drinking Problem"
 "Pet Cobra"
 "Sol's Warts"
 "Breast Enlargement"
 "Roofing"
 "Gay Hairdresser"
 "Volunteer"
 "Terrorist Pizza"
 "Pico's Mexican Hairpiece"
 "A Little Emergency"
 "Sparky The Clown"
 "Security Services"
 "Diamond Dealer"
 "Pablo Honey"
 "The Mattress King"
 "Sporting Goods"
 "Scaffolding"
 "Sex Therapy"
 "Sol's Phobia"
 "Cremation Services"
 "Fava Beans"
 "Husband Beating"

References

The Jerky Boys albums
2004 compilation albums
Comedy compilation albums
Select Records compilation albums
2000s comedy albums